This is a list of lists of armoured fighting vehicles. 

By period 
 List of armoured fighting vehicles of World War I
 List of interwar armoured fighting vehicles
 List of military vehicles of World War II
 List of armoured fighting vehicles of World War II
 List of modern armoured fighting vehicles
 List of main battle tanks by generation

By country 
 List of armoured fighting vehicles by country
List of Sd.Kfz. designations (Germany from 1939)
Tanks in the Japanese Army (Japan up to present)
 List of Polish armoured fighting vehicles
 List of tanks of the Soviet Union
List of armoured fighting vehicles of Ukraine
 List of tanks of the United Kingdom (United Kingdom up to 1945)
 List of FV series military vehicles (United Kingdom after 1945)
 List of "M" series military vehicles (United States)

By type 
 List of armoured trains
 List of artillery, including self-propelled guns
 List of main battle tanks by country

See also 
 Armoured fighting vehicle classification
 Tank
 Tank classification
 History of the tank